Fanny Cochrane Smith (née Cochrane; December 1834 – 24 February 1905) was an Aboriginal Tasmanian, born in December 1834. She is considered to be the last fluent speaker of the Flinders Island lingua franca, a Tasmanian language,<ref>NJB Plomley, 1976b. Friendly mission: the Tasmanian journals of George Augustus Robinson 1829–34. Kingsgrove. pp. xiv–xv.</ref> and her wax cylinder recordings of songs are the only audio recordings of any of Tasmania's indigenous languages. Her recordings were inducted into the UNESCO Australian Memory of the World Register in 2017.

Early life
Fanny Cochrane's mother Tanganutura and a man named Nicremeric or Nicermenic, sometimes reported as her father, were two of the Tasmanian Aboriginals settled on Flinders Island in the 1830s by George Augustus Robinson; according to Norman Tindale her father was Cottrel Cochrane, of European descent, and Nicremeric was her stepfather. She was born at Settlement Point (or Wybalenna, meaning Black Man's House) on Flinders Island. No indigenous name is known; Robinson gave European names to all the Indigenous Tasmanians who arrived at the island as part of his attempt to suppress their culture.

From the age of five to eight she lived in the home of Robert Clark, the Wybalenna preacher, and was then sent to the orphan school in Hobart to learn domestic service skills, after which she returned to Wybalenna. She served as Clark's servant until the station closed in 1847. In 1847 her parents, along with the survivors of Wybalenna, were removed to Oyster Cove. There is no evidence that Nicermenic was her father or that he was on Flinders Island in the 1830s. In June 1834, the year of Fanny's birth on Flinders Island, he was reported to Robinson as being involved in stealing a boat on the Leven River on the NW Coast with Probelatter.

Family
In 1854, Fanny married William Smith, an English sawyer and ex-convict, and between 1855 and 1880 they had 11 children.

Following her marriage, Fanny and her husband ran a boarding-house in Hobart. The Smiths grew their own food but derived their income from timber.

Final years
Following the death of Truganini in 1876, Fanny laid claim to be "the last Tasmanian". While there was some dispute as to whether she or Truganini was the last Tasmanian Aboriginal person, in 1889 the government of the Colony of Tasmania granted her  of land and increased her annuity to £50. She became a Methodist and gave the land needed to build a Methodist church at Nicholls Rivulet, which opened in 1901.

Cochrane Smith died of pneumonia and pleurisy at Port Cygnet,  from Oyster Cove, on 24 February 1905.

In 1898, Henry Ling Roth published a paper in the Journal of the Royal Anthropological Institute examining Smith's claim to be a "full-blood" Aboriginal Tasmanian. He did not examine her personally, but compared locks of her hair with samples of earlier Tasmanians, and conducted a photographic comparison of her and Truganini. Roth concluded that Smith was actually mixed-race, as she had "Europeanised" facial characteristics, much lighter skin than Truganini, and hair that was "wavy" rather than "woolly".

Legacy
 
Smith is known for her wax cylinder recordings of Aboriginal songs, recorded in 1899, which constitute the only audio recordings of an indigenous Tasmanian language. Five cylinders were cut; however, in 1949 a Tasmanian newspaper noted that only four remained, as the fifth cylinder, "on which was recorded the translation of the songs, was broken some time ago". Upon hearing her own performance, Smith had cried "My poor race. What have I done?"; she believed the voice to be that of her mother.

The recording of Smith's songs was the subject of a 1998 song by Australian folk singer Bruce Watson, The Man and the Woman and the Edison Phonograph''. Watson is the great-grandson of Horace Watson, who recorded Fanny in 1903.

A photograph of Fanny Cochrane Smith and Horace Watson is displayed in the collection of the National Museum of Australia.

References

External links
 Listen to Fanny Cochrane Smith's recording and read more about the first and last recordings of Tasmanian Aboriginal songs and language on australianscreen online
 'Fanny Cochrane Smith's Tasmanian Aboriginal Songs' has been added to the National Film and Sound Archive's Sounds of Australia.
 State Library of Tasmania Images Photos of Smith, Fanny Cochrane

Indigenous Tasmanian people
1905 deaths
1834 births
Deaths from pneumonia in Tasmania
Last known speakers of an Australian Aboriginal language
Australian Methodists
19th-century Australian women
20th-century Australian women